Karthyayani Amma (born ) is an Indian woman who passed a literacy examination with top marks at the age of 96.She received the Nari Shakti Puraskar award the highest civilian award for a woman by the Govt. of India.

Early life 
Karthyayani Amma was born . She is from Cheppad,Haripad in the state of Kerala in India. As a child she had to work and so stopped attending school. She married and had six children, working as a street sweeper and maid. She is a vegetarian who rises at 4 a.m. every morning.

Fame 
By 2018, Karthyayani Amma was living at the Laksham Veedu Colony, social housing for elderly people. She was inspired to take a learning course by her daughter, who had passed an examination at the age of sixty. In August 2018, she took an examination alongside 40,362 other people, as part of the Kerala State Literacy Mission Authority's Aksharalaksham ("Million Letter") programme. She was the oldest person to take the test in her district. She had been given lessons in reading and writing by her great-grandchildren, who were nine and twelve years old.

Tested on reading, writing and mathematics, Karthyayani Amma scored 98 out of a possible 100 marks, giving her the top grade. She commented afterwards "I learned so much for no reason. The tests were way too easy for me". After her success in the examination, Karthyayani Amma became a national celebrity: film star Manju Warrier met her during Diwali; C. Raveendranath (the Keralan education minister) gave her a laptop; Pinarayi Vijayan, Chief Minister of Kerala, gave her a certificate of merit. She told The Economic Times her ambition was to pass the next level examination at the age of 100.

Karthyayani Amma became a Commonwealth of Learning Goodwill Ambassador in 2019. In March 2020, she was honoured with the Nari Shakti Puraskar 2019 award, presented by Ram Nath Kovind, the President of India. She had to fly to Delhi. Amma had never flown before but she was reassured by a former awardee M.S. Sunil days before she flew to the Presidential Palace. Another recipient of the award was fellow Keralan Bhageerathi Amma, who at 105 is the oldest person to have passed an Aksharalaksham examination.

Inspired by her story, Vikas Khanna has made a documentary called Barefoot Empress, which chronicles her journey and spirit.

References 

1920s births
Living people
Women from Kerala
Nari Shakti Puraskar winners
Maids
21st-century Indian women
21st-century Indian people
20th-century Indian women
20th-century Indian people